Albert Decatur Kniskern (December 2, 1861 – November 19, 1930) attended the United States Military Academy and was a brigadier general during World War I.

Early life
Albert D. Kniskern was born in Monee, Illinois on December 2, 1861, the son of Philip W. Kniskern and Cornelia Louisa (Goodenow) Kniskern. Kniskern's surname was originally "Niskern"; he changed it to "Kniskern" in 1904. He graduated from Hastings High School in Hastings, Michigan in 1882, then began attendance at the United States Military Academy (West Point). He graduated 25th of 77 in the class of 1886.

Awards
Kniskern was a recipient of the Army Distinguished Service Medal for his World War I service, the citation for which reads:

Family
On July 1, 1886, Kniskern married Estelle A. (Wheeler) Kniskern. They were the parents of sons Lewis T.  and Philip W.

References

External links

1861 births
1930 deaths
People from Will County, Illinois
People from Villa Park, Illinois
United States Military Academy alumni
United States Army generals
Recipients of the Distinguished Service Medal (US Army)
Burials in Michigan
Military personnel from Illinois
United States Army personnel of World War I